Doon de Mayence also known as Doolin de Maience, Doon de Maience or Doolin de Mayence was a fictional hero of the Old French chansons de geste, who gives his name to the third cycle of the Charlemagne romances dealing with the feudal revolts.

There is no single unifying theme in the geste of Doon de Mayence. The rebellious barons are connected by the poets with Doon by fictitious genealogical ties and all are represented as opposing Charlemagne, although their adventures—insofar as they possess a historical basis—generally occur before (or after) his reign.

The general insolence of their attitude to the sovereign suggests that Charlemagne is here only a pseudonym for his weaker successors. The tradition of a traitorous family of Mayence (Mainz), which was developed in Italy into a series of stories about criminals, appeared later than the Carolingian cycle. A contributor to the Chronicle of Fredegar states (iv. 87) that the army of Sigebert was betrayed from within its own ranks by men of Mayence, in a battle fought with Radulf on the banks of the Unstrut in Thuringia.

The chief heroes of the poems which make up Doon de Mayence are Ogier the Dane, the four sons of Aymon, and Huon of Bordeaux. Doon himself was probably one of the last characters to be clearly defined, and the chanson de geste relating his exploits was drawn up partly with the view of supplying a suitable ancestor for the other heroes—in modern terms, a prequel. The second half of the poem, detailing Doon’s wars in Saxony, is perhaps based on historical events but the first half, a separate romance dealing with his romantic childhood, is a fiction dating back to the 13th century. Doon had twelve sons, of whom the most noteworthy are:
 Gaufrey de Danemarche, the father of Ogier the Dane
 Doon de Nanteuil, whose son Gamier married the beautiful Aye d’Avignon
 Griffon d’Hauteville, father of the arch-traitor Ganelon
 Duke Aymon de Dordone or Dourdan, whose four sons (including Renaud de Montauban) were relentlessly pursued by Charles
 Beuves d’Aigremont, whose sons were the enchanter Maugris and Vivien de Monbranc
 Sevin (or Seguin), the father of Huon of Bordeaux
 Girart de Roussillon, hero, married to Bertha, opponent of Charles
 Others, less renowned

The history of these figures is given in Doon de Mayence, Gaufrey, the romances relating to Ogier, Aye d’Avignon, the fragmentary Doon de Nanteuil, Gui de Nanteuil, Tristan de Nanteuil, Parise la Duchesse, Maugis d’Aigremont, Vivien l’amachour de Monbranc, Renaus de Montauban (or Les Quatre Fils Aymon) and Huon de Bordeaux.

References

Male characters in literature
Fictional knights
Matter of France
Chansons de geste